The 2018 Russian Figure Skating Championships were held from 19 to 24 December 2017 in Saint Petersburg. Medals were awarded in the disciplines of men's singles, ladies' singles, pair skating, and ice dance. The results were among the criteria used to select Russia's teams to the 2018 European Championships, 2018 Winter Olympics, and 2018 World Championships.

Competitions 
In the 2017–18 season, Russian skaters will compete in domestic qualifying events and national championships for various age levels. The Russian Cup series will lead to three events – the Russian Championships, the Russian Junior Championships, and the Russian Cup Final.

Medalists of most important competitions

Senior Championships 
The senior Championships were held in Saint Petersburg from 19 to 24 December 2017. Competitors qualified through international success or by competing in the Russian Cup series' senior-level events.

Entries 
The Russian figure skating federation published the full list of entries on 15 December 2017.

Results

Men

Ladies

Pairs

Ice dance

Junior Championships 
The 2018 Russian Junior Championships will be held in Saransk, Mordovia from 23 to 26 January 2018. Competitors will qualify by competing in the Russian Cup series' junior-level events. The results of the Junior Championships are part of the selection criteria for the 2018 World Junior Championships.

Entries 
The Russian figure skating federation published the full list of entries on 22 January 2018.

Results

Men

Ladies

Pairs

Ice dance

International team selections

European Championships 
Russia's team to the 2018 European Championships was published on 24 December 2017.

Winter Olympics 
Russia's team to the 2018 Winter Olympics was published on 21 January 2018.

World Junior Championships 
Russia's team to the 2018 World Junior Championships. The International Skating Union published the full list of entries on 13 February 2018.

World Championships 
Russia's team to the 2018 World Championships. The International Skating Union published the full list of entries on 28 February 2018.

References

Citations 

Russian Figure Skating Championships
Russian Championships
Russian Championships
Figure Skating Championships
Figure Skating Championships
December 2017 events in Russia
January 2018 sports events in Russia